Nicolás Federico Spolli (born 20 February 1983) is a retired Argentine professional footballer who played as a defender.

Club career

Newell's Old Boys
Born in Rosario, Spolli began his youth career with hometown club, Newell's Old Boys. In 2005, he was promoted to the senior squad. At the club he was soon a regular in the starting eleven, and by 2009, he made over 100 appearances and also hit the back of the net nearly ten times. He was a fan favourite as well.

Calcio Catania
In July 2009, Calcio Catania sporting director, Pietro Lo Monaco confirmed that the Sicilian club were deep into negotiations with Newell's for the defender and on 25 July 2009, the deal was finalized and Spolli officially became a Catania player. He was Catania's ninth transfer of the 2009 summer transfer window, and proved himself as an integral part of Catania's starting eleven, early in his Serie A career. The player made 26 Serie A appearances in his first season, netting one goal, helping Catania to an impressive 12th-place finish in the Serie A and also a record points total for the club in a top flight season. 
In his next two seasons with the club, Spolli and his team continued their recent success and endured three additional seasons of record point totals in Serie A, making it five consecutive seasons of this achievement.

Spolli is currently part of a record-breaking Catania outfit that picked up 56 points from 38 Serie A matches. This performance saw the club also break its record number of home victories in a single season, its record number of victories overall in a single top flight campaign, as well as its record points total in Serie A for the fifth consecutive season.

On 17 January 2019, Spolli joined to Crotone on loan with an obligation to buy.

Career statistics

References

External links
 futbolxxi.com Argentine Primera statistics  
 canewellsoldboys.com.ar
 pasionrojinegra.com
 goal.com
 calciocatania.it

1983 births
Living people
Footballers from Rosario, Santa Fe
Association football defenders
Argentine footballers
Argentine expatriate footballers
Argentine Primera División players
Serie A players
Serie B players
Newell's Old Boys footballers
Catania S.S.D. players
A.S. Roma players
A.C. Carpi players
A.C. ChievoVerona players
Genoa C.F.C. players
F.C. Crotone players
Expatriate footballers in Italy
Argentine people of Italian descent
Argentine expatriate sportspeople in Italy